The 2017–18 Louisiana Tech Lady Techsters basketball team represented the Louisiana Tech University during the 2017–18 NCAA Division I women's basketball season. The Lady Techsters, led by second year co-head coaches Brooke Stoehr and Scott Stoehr, played their home games at Thomas Assembly Center and were members of Conference USA. They finished the season 19–12, 10–6 in C-USA play to finish in a 4-way tie for third place. They lost in the quarterfinals of the C-USA women's tournament to North Texas. They received an at-large bid to the Women's National Invitation Tournament where they lost to Missouri State in the first round.

Roster

Schedule

|-
!colspan=9 style=| Non-conference regular season

|-
!colspan=9 style=| Conference USA regular season

|-
!colspan=9 style=| Conference USA Women's Tournament

|-
!colspan=9 style=| WNIT

See also
2017–18 Louisiana Tech Bulldogs basketball team

References

Louisiana Tech Lady Techsters basketball seasons
Louisiana Tech
Louisiana Tech
Louisiana Tech
Louisiana